John Frederick Stein  is a British physiologist. He is a fellow of Magdalen College, Oxford, and holds a professorship in physiology at the University of Oxford. He has research interests in the neurological basis of dyslexia.

Life
A doctor of philosophy, Stein became a research biologist and neurologist and took up a teaching career. He is active in furthering the medical benefits of animal testing, speaking at pro-testing rallies and demonstrations, and has defended animal testing in high-profile television interviews.

He is the chair of the Dyslexia Research Trust and is a proponent of the magnocellular theory of dyslexia. He has supervised many medical and physiology students at the University conducting laboratory work investigating the theory. He is a trustee of the Institute for Food, Brain and Behaviour and Chair of the Institute's Science Advisory Council.

Stein came into the public eye when Gordon Brown suggested a student had been discriminated against because of her state school education. This was despite the fact that she had comparable qualifications to the accepted applicants, who came from a broad range of backgrounds.

Stein is the brother of the chef Rick Stein, and the uncle of the DJ Judge Jules.

Stein was elected as a Fellow of the Academy of Medical Sciences in 2014.

Deep brain stimulation 
Along with Tipu Aziz and Kevin Warwick, Stein is presently working on an intelligent Deep brain stimulation system for Parkinson's disease.

Dyslexia research 

Alongside his former D.Phil. student, Joe Taylor, Stein has advocated a new theory of central noradrenergic deficiency in Dyslexia. Taylor and Stein have proposed that increasing noradrenergic output from the locus coeruleus via a subcortical irradiance detection pathway may prove effective in the treatment of the condition.

References

External links
 Homepage of Professor John Stein
 Dyslexia Research Trust
 Institute for Food, Brain and Behaviour

Fellows of Magdalen College, Oxford
English people of German descent
Living people
Dyslexia researchers
Year of birth missing (living people)
British neurologists
Fellows of the Academy of Medical Sciences (United Kingdom)